The women's RS:X competition at the 2010 Asian Games in Shanwei was held from 14 to 20 November 2010.

Schedule
All times are China Standard Time (UTC+08:00)

Results

Legend
DNF — Did not finish
RAF — Retired after finishing

References

External links
 

Women's RS:X